Rachana is a genus of butterflies in the family Lycaenidae.

Species
Rachana australis (Schroeder & Treadaway, 1990)
Rachana circumdata (Schroeder, Treadaway & Hayashi, 1981)
Rachana jalindra (Horsfield, 1829)
Rachana mariaba (Hewitson, 1869)
Rachana mioae (Hayashi, 1978)
Rachana plateni (Semper, 1890)

References

 , 2006: A further contribution to the Lepidoptera fauna of Balambangan Island (Malaysia, Sabah) (Lepidoptera: Lycaenidae, Pieridae). Fuatao 51: 1-7.
 , 1990: Zur kenntnis philippinischer Lycaenidae, 7 (Lepidoptera). Entomologische Zeitschrift 100 (?): 404-407.
 , 1978: Lycaenid butterflies from Mindanao, with the descriptions of new genus, new species and new subspecies (Lepidoptera: Lycaenidae). Tyô to Ga. 29(3): 164-168. 
 , 1981: Zur Kenntnis philippinischer Lycaenidae(Lep.). Ent. Z.. 24: 265-269.
 , 1978: In Corbet, A. S. & Pendlebury, H. M., The Butterflies of the Malay Peninsula, edn 3. Kuala Lumpur.
 , 2012: Revised checklist of the butterflies of the Philippine Islands (Lepidoptera: Rhopalocera). Nachrichten des Entomologischen Vereins Apollo, Suppl. 20: 1-64.

Iolaini
Lycaenidae genera
Taxa named by John Nevill Eliot